Rebecca Ann Thomas (born December 10, 1984) is an American filmmaker and television director, best known for writing and directing the film Electrick Children and episodic television, including Stranger Things, Limetown, and When the Streetlights Go On.

Personal life
Thomas was raised as a member of the Church of Jesus Christ of Latter-day Saints in Las Vegas; she served a mission for 18 months in Japan.  She is married to Mark Garbett (of The Moth & The Flame).

Directing career
Thomas' short film called "Nobody Knows You, Nobody Gives a Damn" premiered at the 2009 Sundance Film Festival.

Her debut feature, Electrick Children, debuted at the Berlin International Film Festival on 10 February 2012. It also played in the U.S. at the South by Southwest Film Festival on 15 March 2012.

Thomas directed episode seven, "The Lost Sister", of the second season of the Netflix series, Stranger Things.

Thomas directed all 10 episodes of Limetown, starring Jessica Biel, and also directed all 10 episodes of When the Streetlights Go On.

Filmography
Short film

Feature film

Television

Other credits

References

External links
 On Filming Electrick Children: In Her Own Words
 

1984 births
Living people
American women film directors
American women screenwriters
People from Las Vegas
Columbia University alumni
American Mormon missionaries in Japan
Film directors from Nevada
Screenwriters from Nevada
21st-century American women